The 2006 ICC Under-19 Cricket World Cup was played in Sri Lanka from 2 to 15 February 2006.

The final was played between Pakistan and India in Colombo, which Pakistan won by 38 runs, enabling them to become the first back-to-back champions of the tournament.

Teams and qualification

The ten full members of the International Cricket Council (ICC) qualified automatically:

 
 
 
 
 
 
 
 
 
 

Another six teams qualified through regional qualification tournaments:

2005 ACC Under-19 Cup
  (1st place)
2005 Africa/EAP U19 Championship
 (1st place)
 (2nd place)

2005 Americas U19 Championship
  (1st place)
2005 European U19 Championship
  (1st place)
  (2nd place)

Grounds 

The matches were played on five grounds in Colombo:
Nondescripts Cricket Club Ground
Colombo Cricket Club Ground
Sinhalese Sports Club Ground
Paikiasothy Saravanamuttu Stadium
Ranasinghe Premadasa Stadium

Group stage

Group A

Group B

Group C

Group D

Quarter-finals results

Super League Quarter-finals

Plate Championship Quarter-finals

Semi-finals results

Plate Championship Semi-finals

Super League Play-off Semi-finals

Plate Championship Play-off Semi-finals

Super League Semi-finals

Final results

Plate Championship Play-off final

Super League Play-off final

Plate Championship final

The final

A dramatic final was played between Pakistan and India in Colombo. After Pakistan set a very low target of 110 runs to win for India, a stunning Pakistani bowling performance devastated India's top-order batsmen, taking the first six wickets for nine runs. India was eventually dismissed for 71, enabling Pakistan to become the first country ever to defend the title successfully and become back-to-back champions of the tournament.

Final

Final standings

Future Players
Players that featured for their national team in the future were:

Australia – Moises Henriques, Jon Holland, Jackson Bird, Aaron Finch, Usman Khawaja, Matthew Wade, Ben Cutting and David Warner (Tom Cooper also represented Australia but went on to play international cricket for Netherlands)

Bangladesh – Mushfiqur Rahim, Shakib Al Hasan, Raqibul Hasan, Tamim Iqbal, Dolar Mahmud, Suhrawadi Shuvo, Kamrul Islam, Shamsur Rahman and Mehrab Hossain, Jr. (Sirajullah Khadim who played for Bangladesh U-19 later represented Portugal)

England – Moeen Ali, Mark Stoneman

India – Piyush Chawla, Cheteshwar Pujara, Rohit Sharma, Ravindra Jadeja, Ishant Sharma and Shahbaz Nadeem 
                      
Ireland – Gary Wilson, Andrew Poynter, Gary Kidd, Greg Thompson and James Hall (Eoin Morgan also represented Ireland but went on to play international cricket for England)

Nepal – Amrit Bhattarai, Basant Regmi, Gyanendra Malla, Kanishka Chaugai, Mahesh Chhetri, Paras Khadka and Sharad Vesawkar

New Zealand – Martin Guptill, Roneel Hira, Tim Southee, Todd Astle, Colin Munro and Hamish Bennett

Pakistan – Sarfraz Ahmed, Imad Wasim, Anwar Ali, Nasir Jamshed and Rameez Raja

Scotland – Richie Berrington, Moneeb Iqbal, Gordon Goudie and Calum MacLeod

South Africa – Dean Elgar, Mthokozisi Shezi, Richard Levi and Wayne Parnell (Craig Kieswetter also represented South Africa but went on to play international cricket for England)

Sri Lanka – Angelo Mathews, Dimuth Karunaratne, Ashan Priyanjan, Isuru Udana, Sachith Pathirana and Thisara Perera

West Indies – Andre Fletcher, Sunil Narine, Kieron Pollard, Nelon Pascal, Jason Mohammed, Leon Johnson, William Perkins and Kemar Roach

Zimbabwe – Sean Williams, Prince Masvaure, Taurai Muzarabani, Chamu Chibhabha, Graeme Cremer, Friday Kasteni, Taurai Muzarabani and Keegan Meth (Gary Ballance who played for Zimbabwe U-19 later represented England)

See also 

 2004 ICC Under-19 Cricket World Cup

References

 2006 U-19 World Cup
 ICC Under-19 World Cup – final India Under-19s v Pakistan Under-19s – ESPN Cricinfo
 ICC Under-19 Cricket World Cup

ICC Under-19 Cricket World Cup
2006 in Sri Lankan cricket
2006 in cricket
International cricket competitions in Sri Lanka
2006 ICC Under-19 Cricket World Cup